The sixteenth cycle of America's Next Top Model premiered on February 23, 2011, and was the tenth cycle to be aired on The CW. The catch-phrase for this cycle is "Rainy Day Women."

The prizes for this cycle were:
A modeling contract with IMG Models.
A fashion spread in Vogue Italia, and both the cover and a spread in Beauty In Vogue, and will be featured on Vogue.it.
A US$100,000 contract with CoverGirl cosmetics.

All three permanent judges from the previous cycle – Vogue editor-at-large André Leon Talley, photographer Nigel Barker and Tyra Banks herself – remain.

The international destination for this cycle is Marrakech, Morocco. The show's first visit to Africa since cycle 4, as well in Northern Africa and the Arab world. 

The winner was 19-year-old Brittani Kline from Beech Creek, Pennsylvania with Molly O'Connell placing as the runner-up.

Contestants
(ages stated are at start of contest)

Episodes

Summaries

Call-out order

 The contestant won the challenge
 The contestant was eliminated
 The contestant quit the competition
 The contestant won the competition

Bottom two

 The contestant was eliminated after their first time in the bottom two
 The contestant was eliminated after their second time in the bottom two
 The contestant was eliminated after their third time in the bottom two
 The contestant quit the competition 
 The contestant was eliminated in the final judging and placed as the runner-up

Average  call-out order
Casting call-out order and final two are not included.

Photo shoot guide

Episode 1 photo shoot: Backstage of a fashion show shot by Russell James
Episode 2 photo shoot: Extreme beauty shots with bees & jewelry
Episode 3 photo shoot: Alice in Wonderland inspired couture dresses and gowns by Lori Goldstein in groups on a ranch 
Episode 4 commercial: Retro-style coffee commercial
Episode 5 photo shoot:' Rachel Zoe's faux fur with a baby jaguar 
Episode 6 photo shoot: Blondes vs. Brunettes covered in mud
Episode 7 photo shoot: Crazies for fashion in Universal Studios
Episode 8 photo shoot: Eco-friendly couture in a landfill
Episode 10 photo shoot: Nomads posing on a camel
Episode 11 photo shoot: Moroccan women In Jemaa el-Fnaa
Episode 12 photo shoot: Love story on a Marrakech beach with a male model
Episode 13 photo shoot and commercial: CoverGirl Lip Perfection Lipcolor commercial and print ad, and Beauty In Vogue spread

Makeovers
 Dominique - Long curly dark red weave with matching eyebrows
 Sara - Cut super short and dyed dark brown
 Dalya - Long straight black weave 
 Monique - Long wavy fusion bond extensions
 Mikaela - Pocahontas inspired long straight black extensions
 Jaclyn - Volumized curls
 Kasia - Crimped blonde extensions
 Alexandria - Long straight blonde extensions  
 Hannah - Blonde highlights and eyebrows lightened
 Molly - Diana Ross inspired curly blonde weave; later, weave removed, later, short asymmetrical crop
 Brittani - Black bob with bangs, later, pixie cut

Cast members

 J. Alexander – runway coach
 Jay Manuel – photo shoot director

Post-Top Model careers
 Alexandria Everett participated in America's Next Top Model, cycle 17: All-Stars along with other returning models. She finished 7th place overall.
 Molly O'Connell was originally chosen to participate in the All-Stars cycle, but the day of the live judging in episode one was the same day as the cycle 16 finale airing. The producers then switched her out with Alexandria for spoiler purposes.
 Monique Weingart was asked to participate in the All-Star cycle along with Alexandria, but she declined.
 Brittani Kline is currently signed with Muse Model Management in New York, Premier Model Management in London, Why Not Models in Milan, Paragon Model Management in Mexico City and P Models. She has walked for Balenciaga Resort and Prabal Gurung. She also appeared in Interview Magazine. She used to be signed with IMG Models in New York City under the name of "Autumn" but her contract was terminated. She appeared in a Vogue Mexico advertorial for United Colors of Benetton. Her Beauty In Vogue and Vogue Italia spreads were published in November 2011.
 Dalya Morrow has signed with Wünder Model Management.
 Jaclyn Poole signed with Models International, but as of 2020 she had left the fashion industry and currently works as a grade school teacher.
Mikaela Schipani has been signed with I Model Management, Paragon Models in Mexico and Ford Models in Miami. She also signed with Fenton Moon NY along with Andrea Debevc and Natasha Galkina and have Fashion Week S/S 2013 Show Cards for New York S/S 2013.
Hannah Kat Jones met her manager at ThirdHill Entertainment and Hannah signed with Paradigm, booking a guest star role as Carrie on the Disney Channel show, Austin & Ally. Hannah has also hosted for "TMI", a sketch comedy show at Second City in Hollywood.

Controversies

According to winner Brittani Kline, when the contestants were in Morocco, the show “started punishing girls for whenever they didn’t win the challenge of the day”. She claims that the producers “said ‘since you lost and didn’t indulge in the Moroccan culture, we’re gonna make you indulge in the culture’. So me and this other girl had to play butcher: literally.” She recounts that “There was a bulls head, there was some like organs, some bones on a table and they’re like ‘put this into this wagon’. ‘Put the meat in the fridge and then take the wagon back to where it was’”. She continued, saying “It was me and this vegetarian girl and ... she’s like ‘Oh my God!’. It took both of us to lift the bull head ... but that never got on the episode.”

During a fan meet and greet challenge, Monique was approached by a man who asked her to sign a photo and write on it that he was a good kisser. She declined but said that fellow contestant Alexandria would do it. After resisting the man’s advances repeatedly, she finally gave in and have him a kiss on the cheek. She was criticised by J. Alexander for this, who said this could lead onto “stalking”, which many deemed unfair, since she was heavily pressured by the man to do so.

Notes

References

External links
Official website

A16
2011 American television seasons
Television shows filmed in California
Television shows filmed in Morocco